Enow Juvette Tabot (born 8 June 1989) is a former Cameroonian footballer who played as a midfielder.

Career
After playing with Tiko United in his homeland, Tabot signed in the summer of 2009 with Slovenian PrvaLiga club Interblock from Ljubljana. At the end of his first season with Interblock, the club ended up relegated to the Slovenian Second League, where he played the 2010–11 season. After the failure of achieving promotion, Tabot left Interblock in summer 2011.

National team
Tabot was part of the Cameroon squad at the 2009 African Youth Championship and at the 2009 FIFA U-20 World Cup.

Honours

Tiko United
Cameroon Première Division: 2009

References

External links
PrvaLiga profile 

1989 births
Living people
Cameroonian footballers
Association football midfielders
Tiko United players
Cameroonian expatriate footballers
Slovenian PrvaLiga players
Expatriate footballers in Slovenia
NK IB 1975 Ljubljana players
Cameroon under-20 international footballers